Mandiraja (Javanese : ꦩꦤ꧀ꦢꦶꦫꦗ) is a district (kecamatan) in Banjarnegara Regency, Central Java, Indonesia. The district has an area of 52.62 km², with a population of 78,090 people at the 2020 Indonesian population census. Mandiraja is the second largest town in the Banjarnegara regency after the regency's administrative town of Banjarnegara. Mandiraja is also 6 km east of the General Sudirman Airport.

Borders
Mandiraja district is located in between  7°27'10" S and 109°31'22" E and is bordered by :

Village list
Mandiraja has 16 villages and is further divided into 388 (RT) and 73 (RW) the following is the population of the Mandiraja by village in 2020:

Geography
Mandiraja District is part of the Banjarnegara Regency administrative area, located in the southwest in terms of the layout and geography of the area, the type of land area or shape including the Serayu River basin, which stretches from the same direction to the northern boundary between Mandiraja and Purbalingga Districts.
The distance from Mandiraja District to the capital of the Banjarnegara Regency is about 21 km, and is located at an altitude of 132 metres above sea level. The condition of the area consists of lowland and hilly areas; Salamerta village, Glempang, Kebanaran, Somawangi and Jalatunda village are villages where the land is hilly, while the other 11 villages are low-lying areas.

Climate & Weather
Mandiraja has a tropical climate, with humidity ranging between +50-90%, peaking in December to March, with the lowest levels in July to September. The average rainfall annual is ±2.586 mm/year with a number of rainy days ± 188 days, with the rainy season occurring from November to March and the dry season from April to October.

Demography
In 2010, the district had a population of 63,779 inhabitants. In the 2020 census, Mandiraja District had the third-largest population in the Banjarnegara Regency after the Punggelan and Purwanegara districts, with 78,090 inhabitants, which is spread over 16 villages. Mandiraja has a gender difference ratio of 96.22%, a population growth of 1.99%. Mandiraja is inhabited by various ethnic groups; the Javanese ethnic group is indigenous to this region, while besides them in Mandiraja there are also other ethnic groups such as Sundanese, Chinese, Arabs And others.

Education
Achievement in the field of education in the Mandiraja District is closely related to educational facilities at the elementary school level in Mandiraja. In the 2018/2019 school year a teacher on average teaches 16 elementary school students, the higher the level of education the teacher burden is also increasingly increased, for junior high school education ( junior high school ) an average teacher reaches 25 junior high school students.

Culture
Mandiraja has a traditional culture, including Wayang Kulit, a traditional Javanese art. In addition, there is a traditional musical instrument, the calung, a kind of idiophone made from bamboo, which is played by hitting the blades or segment.

References

External link
 BPS Kabupaten Banjarnegara
 Website Resmi Kabupaten Banjarnegara
 Prodeskel Binapemdes Kemendagri

 When The Weather is Fine Episode 4 - Sub Indonesia - Umum

Banjarnegara Regency
Districts of Central Java
Populated places in Central Java